Mary-Alice Waters is a socialist feminist, journalist and activist in the United States.

Waters became involved in Trotskyist politics at a young age, and joined the Socialist Workers Party (SWP) in the fall of 1962 while a student at Carleton College in Minnesota in the fall of 1962.   She became the editor of their youth paper, Young Socialist, and the national secretary of the Young Socialist Alliance.

In the early 1980s, Waters, along with Jack Barnes and others in the SWP leadership, began to reject the label of "Trotskyism" and the theory of Permanent Revolution, in favour of building links with the Cuban Communist Party and Sandinista National Liberation Front.

In December 1968, she joined the editorial staff of The Militant and was named managing editor in 1969 and editor in chief in January, 1971.

Today, Waters is the President of the Pathfinder Press and the editor of New International magazine.  She has written a number of books on political topics.

References

Year of birth missing (living people)
Living people
Members of the Socialist Workers Party (United States)
American activists
American women journalists
Carleton College alumni
Marxist journalists
Socialist feminists